Sean Earley (May 7, 1953 - May, 1992) was an American artist who resided mostly in the state of Texas. In addition to his fine art, mostly oil on canvas, he worked as a commercial illustrator.

Career
His work has appeared in the Texas Monthly and has been exhibited at the Whitney Museum and Houston Texas' Alternative Museum.  He is widely thought to have died of complications from AIDS.

Legacy
Today, Todd and Lola Lott of Dallas, TX have the largest collection of Earley's paintings. The Lott's collection includes the entire Presidential Composite Series; 46 presidential portraits from Washington to Reagan. The largest collection outside of Texas is at Bridgewater Fine Arts in New York City.

References

External links 
 Leaving A Legacy - The Sean Earley Retrospective at Boyd
 Sean Earley - Bridgewater Fine Arts

1953 births
1992 deaths
Artists from Texas
AIDS-related deaths in Texas